Live from London 2006 is a DVD by the Fantômas Melvins Big Band that was released on August 26, 2008.

Track listing 
 "Sacrifice" (Flipper cover from Gone Fishin')
 "Page 27" (from Fantômas's Fantômas)
 "Night Goat" (from The Melvins' Houdini)
 "Page 28" (from Fantômas's Fantômas)
 "Page 3" (from Fantômas's Fantômas)
 "Electric Long Thin Wire"
 "The Bit" (from The Melvins' Stag)
 "Page 14" (from Fantômas's Fantômas)
 "Pigs of the Roman Empire" (from the Melvins/Lustmord album Pigs of the Roman Empire)
 "The Omen" (from Fantômas's The Director's Cut)
 "Hooch" (from The Melvins' Houdini)
 "Mombius Hibachi" (from The Melvins' Honky)
 "Page 23" (from Fantômas's Fantômas)
 "Skin Horse" (from The Melvins' Stag)
 "Cape Fear" (from Fantômas's The Director's Cut)
 "Let It All Be" (from The Melvins' The Bootlicker)
 "Lowrider" (War cover from Why Can't We Be Friends?)
 "04/02/05 Saturday" (from Fantômas's Suspended Animation)
 "Page 29" (from Fantômas's Fantômas)
 "04/08/05 Friday" (from Fantômas's Suspended Animation)
 "Spider Baby" (from Fantômas's The Director's Cut)

Extras 
 "Secret" Commentary with Buzz Osborne, Dale Crover, Ipecac co-owner/founder Greg Werckman, booking agent Robby Fraser, and special guest and fan Danny DeVito.

Personnel 
 Dale Crover - drums
 Trevor Dunn - bass, backing vocals
 Dave Lombardo - drums, electronics, programming
 Buzz Osborne - guitar, vocals, keyboards
 Mike Patton - vocals, keyboards, electronics, programming
 David Scott Stone - guitar, bass, electric long thin wires, samples
Filmed by Douglas Pledger, Matthew Rozeik & Alex Gunnis
Edited by Douglas Pledger, sound by Matthew Rozeik
Directed by Douglas Pledger

References

Fantômas (band) video albums
Melvins video albums
2008 video albums
Collaborative albums
Live video albums
2008 live albums
Melvins live albums
Ipecac Recordings live albums
Ipecac Recordings video albums